The Women's Front is a Norwegian radical feminist organization founded in 1972. It was historically associated with the now defunct Workers' Communist Party

History

The organization was founded in 1972 and grew out of the marxist-leninist movement, known as the "M-L movement." It took its name after the historical newspaper named Kvinnefronten ("the women's front") which had been published by the Communist Party of Norway. The organization also built on women's movements against Norway's membership of the European Economic Community. It was closely associated with the Workers' Communist Party. In the 1990s, it became known through the publication of the Lund Report that the organization had been under observation by the Norwegian Police Security Service, which categorized it as a front organization for the Workers' Communist Party, which the Police Security Service considered to be extremist.

During the first part of the 1970s, the organization was briefly the largest women's association in Norway with 3,500 members in 125 towns and cities in 1973, but after the mid 1970s, the organization lost most of its members and the membership declined to a few hundred members. From 1978, the organization became known for its pornography activism, which included showing hard pornographic films in public, intended to scare and upset the audience, which it called "porn against porn."

In 1991 several members left the Women's Front to found a new organization, called the Ottar Women's Group, following disagreements on various issues, especially the Women's Front's relaxation of its stance on pornography. The breakaway faction that formed Ottar Women's Group had been the most radical wing of the Women's Front, but found themselves in the minority at the 1991 annual meeting of the organization.

The Women's Front has published journals under three different names: Kvinnefront (1975–1981), Kvinnejournalen (1982–2004) and thereafter Fett.

Views
According to the organization's original program, its goal was to "fight for women's liberation" by "fighting capitalism and imperialism." It considered "the state, business and capital" to be the main forces which oppressed women. In line with its roots in the anti-imperialist left of the early 1970s, the Women's Front has been critical of newer feminist movements which emerged in the 1980s and 1990s, such as queer feminism.

The organization today describes itself as "a radical feminist organization that opposes all forms of oppression of women, economic, sexual, political and cultural."

The Women's Front has also been active in promoting women's self-determination in abortion and pornography. It has liaised internationally with likeminded organizations in developing countries such as Afghanistan, Palestine and the Philippines and has participated in international networks on abortion, reproduction, trafficking and violence against women.

The Women's Front is traditionally regarded as Norway's main radical feminist organization. Feminist studies scholars and queer feminists Janne Bromseth, Elisabeth Lund Engebretsen, Lin Prøitz, Katrina Roen and Stine H. Bang Svendsen have noted that "trans-exclusionary radical feminism" (TERF) rhetoric appears to be a strong current in the radical feminism of the Women's Front and similar groups in Norway.

References

External links
 Kvinnefronten (Women's Front)) website—

Feminist organisations in Norway
Organizations established in 1972
1972 establishments in Norway
Radical feminist organizations
Women's wings of communist parties